Hixon is a town in Clark County in the U.S. state of Wisconsin. The population was 740 at the 2000 census. The unincorporated community of Clark is located in the town.

Geography
According to the United States Census Bureau, the town has a total area of 33.7 square miles (87.4 km2), of which, 33.3 square miles (86.4 km2) of it is land and 0.4 square miles (1.0 km2) of it (1.13%) is water.

History
The six mile square that would become Hixon was first surveyed in the summer of 1847 by a crew working for the U.S. government. Then in late 1853 another crew marked all the section corners in the township, walking through the woods and swamps, measuring with chain and compass. When done, the deputy surveyor filed this general description:
The Surface of this Township is generally level except a small portion near the Margin of Black River. The Soil is mostly second rate. The Timber is principally White Pine of good quality and valuable for lumber.There are Several large Swamp in the Township most of which are unfit for cultivation. The Township is well watered with numerous Small Streams. Black River Enter this Township in Section 5 and runs through it in Southerly direction until it leaves the Township in Section 32 the banks of which are generally high water from 1 to 2 feet deep and averaging about 150 links in width. It is well adapted to logging purposes. There are no Settlers in the Township. 
The town was named for Gideon C. Hixon, a lumber executive from La Crosse.

Demographics
As of the census of 2000, there were 740 people, 232 households, and 180 families residing in the town. The population density was 22.2 people per square mile (8.6/km2). There were 252 housing units at an average density of 7.6 per square mile (2.9/km2). The racial makeup of the town was 99.32% White, 0.14% Asian, 0.14% from other races, and 0.41% from two or more races. Hispanic or Latino of any race were 0.81% of the population.

There were 232 households, out of which 41.8% had children under the age of 18 living with them, 68.5% were married couples living together, 6.9% had a female householder with no husband present, and 22.4% were non-families. 16.8% of all households were made up of individuals, and 9.1% had someone living alone who was 65 years of age or older. The average household size was 3.19 and the average family size was 3.65.

In the town, the population was spread out, with 35.8% under the age of 18, 6.1% from 18 to 24, 25.9% from 25 to 44, 18.5% from 45 to 64, and 13.6% who were 65 years of age or older. The median age was 32 years. For every 100 females, there were 105.6 males. For every 100 females age 18 and over, there were 97.9 males.

The median income for a household in the town was $36,375, and the median income for a family was $38,611. Males had a median income of $26,912 versus $20,179 for females. The per capita income for the town was $12,092. About 8.6% of families and 12.1% of the population were below the poverty line, including 14.2% of those under age 18 and 19.0% of those age 65 or over.

References

Towns in Wisconsin
Towns in Clark County, Wisconsin